Spinal muscular atrophy with lower extremity predominance 1 (SMALED1) is an extremely rare neuromuscular disorder of infants characterised by severe progressive muscle atrophy which is especially prominent in legs.

The disorder is associated with a genetic mutation in the DYNC1H1 gene (the gene responsible also for one of the axonal types of Charcot–Marie–Tooth disease) and is inherited in an autosomal dominant manner. As with many genetic disorders, there is no known cure to SMALED1.

The condition was first described in a multi-generational family by Walter Timme in 1917. Its linkage to the DYNC1H1 gene was discovered in 2010 by M. B. Harms, et al., who also proposed the current name of the disorder.

See also 
 Spinal muscular atrophies
 Spinal muscular atrophy with lower extremity predominance 2A
 Spinal muscular atrophy with lower extremity predominance 2B

References 

Autosomal dominant disorders
Neurogenetic disorders
Neuromuscular disorders
Rare diseases
Systemic atrophies primarily affecting the central nervous system